The ASG 32 is a Two Seater Class glider manufactured by Alexander Schleicher. The prototype had its maiden flight in Poppenhausen on 31 May 2014. Deliveries began in 2015.

Design and development 
The ASG 32 is a two-seat mid-wing sailplane of composite construction, it has a retractable landing wheel and a horizontal tail mounted atop the vertical fin (T-tail).

The aircraft was announced in April 2013, with the intention that it would fill the gap between the ASK 21 trainer and the larger Schleicher ASH 30 Open Class two seater.  The ASG 32 meets the requirements of the FAI 20 metre Two-Seater Class. Pure sailplane, motorized self-launching and sustainer engine versions were announced.

Construction of the prototype started in 2013, during which the fuselage and tailplane were displayed. The maiden flight was on 31 May 2014, piloted by the designer Michael Greiner and the Schleicher CEO, Peter Kremer.

The electrically powered variant of the ASG 32 will be delivered after the other variants.

The ASG 32 and ASG 32 Mi were awarded an EASA Type Certificate on 11 February 2016.

Variants 

Data from Schleicher 
ASG 32	The pure sailplane, without any engine.
ASG 32 Mi	The motor glider aircraft, capable of self launching with a retractable engine and propeller mounted in the centre fuselage.
ASG 32 El	The electrically propelled motor glider aircraft, capable of sustaining flight for an expected  under engine power.

Specifications (ASG 32 Mi)

See also 

Schempp-Hirth Arcus

References

Notes

Citations 

https://www.nightofscience.de/dynasite.cfm?dsmid=514304

External links 

Schleicher website

2010s German sailplanes
Schleicher aircraft
Motor gliders
Electric aircraft
Mid-wing aircraft
Aircraft first flown in 2014
T-tail aircraft